Soyuz TMA-13M was a 2014 flight to the International Space Station. It transported three members of the Expedition 40 crew to the International Space Station. TMA-13M was the 122nd flight of a Soyuz spacecraft since 1967, and the 39th Soyuz mission to the ISS. The Soyuz remained docked to the space station for the Expedition 41 increment to serve as an emergency escape vehicle until its departure in November 2014.

Crew

Backup crew

Mission highlights

Rollout
The Soyuz FG rocket carrying the Soyuz TMA-13M spacecraft was rolled to the launch pad at Site 1/5 at the Baikonur Cosmodrome on 26 May 2014. Under sunny skies, the roll out began at 7 o'clock in the morning. The rollout was attended by the Soyuz backup crew members, Anton Shkaplerov, Samantha Cristoforetti and Terry Virts. The Soyuz TMA-13M prime crew was not at the event, since it is considered to bring bad luck. Once the 49.5 meter tall Soyuz FG rocket was erected in its vertical launch position, the launcher was enclosed by its service structure, to provide protection and access platforms for workers.

Launch, rendezvous and docking
Launch of Soyuz TMA-13M occurred successfully at 19:57 UTC on May 28, 2014, from the Baikonur Cosmodrome in Kazakhstan. Upon achieving orbit approximately nine minutes after launch, TMA-13M began a four-orbit rendezvous with the International Space Station. Soyuz TMA-13M subsequently docked with the Rassvet module of the ISS at 1:44 UTC on May 29. Hatches were opened between the two spacecraft just over two hours later at 3:52 UTC.

Undocking and return to Earth
Soyuz TMA-13M undocked from the International Space Station at 00:31 UTC on November 10, 2014, with a 4-minute, 41-second deorbit burn occurring at 03:05 UTC. The spacecraft successfully landed northwest of Arkalyk, Kazakhstan at 03:58 UTC.

Gallery

References

Crewed Soyuz missions
Spacecraft launched in 2014
2014 in Russia
Spacecraft which reentered in 2014
Spacecraft launched by Soyuz-FG rockets